Dodecapolis or Dodekapolis refers to a group or confederation of twelve cities. It may refer to:

Ionian dodecapolis
Aeolian dodecapolis
Etruscan dodecapolis

See also
Decapolis (disambiguation)
Pentapolis